Lanka Premier League is a professional Twenty20 cricket league, which is operated by Sri Lanka Cricket. It is contested between 5 franchises comprising cricketers from Sri Lanka and around the world.

A player who leads the cricket team is known as its captain. Each team usually has one nominated captain, although if that player is not participating in a match another player will deputise for them. The captain of a cricket team typically shoulders more responsibility for results than team captains in other sports.

Key

Captains 
This is a list of the players who have acted as captain in at least one match of LPL. Five teams competed in the first season of the league.

See also 
 List of Lanka Premier League records and statistics

References

Cricket captains
Lanka Premier League